Louise Rydqvist (born 18 July 2001) is a Swedish amateur golfer. In 2022, she won the Espirito Santo Trophy and was runner-up at The Womens Amateur Championship.

Amateur career
Drafted to the National Team in 2017, Rydqvist competed at the European Girls' Team Championship twice, winning the bronze on home soil in 2018. In 2019, she played in the Junior Golf World Cup in Japan and the World Junior Girls Championship in Canada.

Rydqvist came close to winning her first international title at the 2018 Irish Girls U18 Open Stroke Play Championship at Roganstown Golf & Country Club, where she was runner-up one shot behind her compatriot Kajsa Arwefjäll. In 2019 she finished tied 3rd at the same event.

Rydqvist graduated from Filbornaskolan Riksidrottsgymnasium Golf in Helsingborg in 2020, after winning the 2020 Swedish Golf School Championship with her school. She accepted an athletic scholarship to the University of South Carolina, and she started playing with the South Carolina Gamecocks women's golf team in the fall of 2021. She was named All-American in her freshman year.

In 2020, Rydqvist played on the Swedish Golf Tour where she shared the Order of Merit title with Line Toft Hansen, after winning the Johannesberg Ladies Open and finishing runner-up at the Allerum Open a stroke behind Sara Kjellker.

In 2022, Rydqvist was runner-up at The Womens Amateur Championship, beaten 4 and 3 by Jess Baker in the final, and played on the winning Swedish team in the Espirito Santo Trophy at Le Golf National in France together with Ingrid Lindblad and Meja Örtengren.

Amateur wins
2016 Puma/Cobra Junior Masters Invitational  
2017 Delsjö Junior Open 
2019 PGA Junior Open by Titleist

Source:

Professional wins (1)

Swedish Golf Tour (1)

^Shortened to 36 holes due to adverse weather conditions

Team appearances
Amateur
European Girls' Team Championship (representing Sweden): 2018, 2019
Toyota Junior Golf World Cup (representing Sweden): 2019
World Junior Girls Championship (representing Sweden): 2019
European Ladies' Team Championship (representing Sweden): 2022
Espirito Santo Trophy (representing Sweden): 2022 (winners)

References

External links

Swedish female golfers
Amateur golfers
South Carolina Gamecocks women's golfers
Sportspeople from Jönköping County
People from Värnamo Municipality
2001 births
Living people